Falsoterinaea is a genus of longhorn beetles of the subfamily Lamiinae, containing the following species:

 Falsoterinaea fuscorufa (Matsushita, 1937)
 Falsoterinaea pakistana Breuning, 1975

References

Pteropliini